"Time to Waste" is a song by Chicago punk rock band Alkaline Trio, released as the first single from their 2005 album Crimson. "Time to Waste" was released to radio on May 24, 2005. It peaked at #40 on Billboard's Modern Rock Tracks chart, #32 on the UK Singles Chart, and #97 on the Eurochart Hot 100 Singles. It was backed with the B-side songs "We Can Never Break Up" and "Don't Say You Won't" from the album's recording sessions.

The song's music video, directed by Linkin Park's Joseph Hahn, depicts the band performing "Time to Waste" in a hangar to the accompaniment of lighting effects and background projection screens.

Track listing

CD versions

7" version

DVD version

Personnel

Band
Matt Skiba – guitar, lead vocals
Dan Andriano – bass, backing vocals
Derek Grant – drums

Additional musicians
Roger Joseph Manning, Jr. - piano

Production
Jerry Finn – producer, mix engineer
Ryan Hewitt – engineer
Seth Waldmann – assistant engineer
Dave Collins – mastering

Cover art
The album's cover art, by Heather Hannoura, features a black-and-white picture version of an image from Book Three of Max Ernst's Une Semaine de Bonté.

Charts

References 

Alkaline Trio songs
2005 songs
Songs written by Matt Skiba
Songs written by Dan Andriano
Songs written by Derek Grant (drummer)
Vagrant Records singles
2005 singles